Sangaree is a census-designated place and unincorporated community in Berkeley County, South Carolina, United States. Its population was 8,220 as of the 2010 census.

Sangaree has a public library, a branch of the Berkeley County Library System.

Demographics

2020 census

As of the 2020 United States census, there were 7,781 people, 2,836 households, and 2,148 families residing in the CDP.

References

Census-designated places in South Carolina
Unincorporated communities in South Carolina
Census-designated places in Berkeley County, South Carolina
Unincorporated communities in Berkeley County, South Carolina